The International Journal of Hygiene and Environmental Health is a peer-reviewed scientific journal covering environmental health. It was established by Max von Pettenkofer in 1883 as Archiv für Hygiene, and it was originally focused exclusively on hygiene. It was later published under the title Zentralblatt für Hygiene und Umweltmedizin after 1971, and it obtained its current title in 2000. It is published 8 times per year by Elsevier and the editors-in-chief are Antonia Calafat (National Center for Environmental Health) and Holger Koch (German Social Accident Insurance). The journal's official website lists its 2021 Journal Citation Reports impact factor as 7.401.

References

External links

Environmental health journals
Elsevier academic journals
Publications established in 1883
English-language journals
8 times per year journals